Sulphur Creek Archeological District is a  historic district in Shasta County, California and Tehama County, California.  It was listed on the National Register of Historic Places in 1980 for its potential to provide information in the future.  The area includes ten designated archeological sites.

It includes sites designated Teh-583 thru Teh-590, Teh-596, and Sha-786.

References

Archaeological sites in California	
National Register of Historic Places in Shasta County, California
National Register of Historic Places in Tehama County, California
National Register of Historic Places in Lassen Volcanic National Park
Buildings and structures completed in the 8th century